Erin Nealy Cox (born 1970) is an American attorney who served as the United States Attorney for the United States District Court for the Northern District of Texas from 2017 to 2021. She was nominated to the position by Donald Trump. After Trump lost the 2020 election, she resigned, becoming a partner at Kirkland & Ellis.

Career 
Prior to assuming the role of United States Attorney, she was a senior advisor at McKinsey & Company in the cybersecurity and risk practice.  She is on the board of directors of Sally Beauty Holdings.

From 1999 to 2008, Nealy Cox was an Assistant United States Attorney in the Northern District of Texas. In 2004 and 2005, she was chief of staff and senior counsel to the Assistant Attorney General in the Office of Legal Policy. Nealy Cox also previously worked at Stroz Friedberg, a cybersecurity and investigations consulting firm. She clerked for Henry Anthony Politz when he was serving as Chief Judge of the United States Court of Appeals for the Fifth Circuit and for Barefoot Sanders when he was serving as a United States District Judge in the Northern District of Texas.

U.S. Attorney 
As U.S. Attorney in the northern district of Texas, Nealy Cox oversaw the prosecution against Boeing for the Boeing 737 MAX disaster. Controversially, she made a prosecution agreement with Boeing that let the executives of the company off the hook for the disaster. On December 17, 2020, Cox announced her resignation effective January 8, 2021. Shortly thereafter, she became a partner at Kirkland & Ellis, Boeing’s lead corporate criminal defense law firm.

References

External links
 Biography at U.S. Attorney's Office

1970 births
Living people
People from Pascagoula, Mississippi
Dedman School of Law alumni
United States Attorneys for the Northern District of Texas
McCombs School of Business alumni
21st-century American lawyers
Assistant United States Attorneys
21st-century American women lawyers
People associated with Kirkland & Ellis